Some Buried Caesar is a detective novel by American writer Rex Stout, the sixth book featuring his character Nero Wolfe. The story first appeared in abridged form in The American Magazine (December 1938), under the title "The Red Bull", it was first published as a novel by Farrar & Rinehart in 1939. In 2000 it was included in the list of the 100 Favorite Mysteries of the Century by the Independent Mystery Booksellers Association.

Plot introduction

On the way to an agricultural fair north of Manhattan, Wolfe's car runs into a tree, stranding Wolfe and Archie at the home of the owner of a chain of fast-food cafés. A neighbor is later found gored to death; the authorities rule the death an accident but Wolfe deduces that it was murder. Lily Rowan, Archie's longtime girlfriend, makes her first appearance.

This is one of several Wolfe plots that break one of Wolfe's cardinal rules, to never conduct business away from the Manhattan brownstone. It involves minor characters who appear in several other Wolfe novels, under different names and in different locales: the self-important police officer who tries to intimidate Archie, and the occasionally bumbling but politically attuned district attorney. The book's title is from The Rubaiyat of Omar Khayyam.

Plot summary

While on their way to a rural exposition in upstate New York to show orchids, Nero Wolfe and Archie Goodwin are involved in a minor car accident. On their way to a nearby house to phone for help, they are threatened by a large bull but are eventually rescued by Caroline Pratt, a local golf champion, and her acquaintance Lily Rowan. The house and bull belong to Thomas Pratt, Caroline's uncle and the owner of a large chain of successful fast food restaurants, and he has purchased the bull—a champion Guernsey called Hickory Caesar Grindon—in order to barbecue it as part of a publicity stunt. 
 
While Wolfe and Archie enjoy Pratt's hospitality, they meet several of Pratt's family and neighbours—Jimmy Pratt, Pratt's indolent nephew; Monte McMillan, the original owner of Caesar, who sold the bull to Pratt after falling into financial difficulties; Clyde Osgood and his sister Nancy, the children of Pratt's neighbour Frederick Osgood; and a New Yorker named Howard Bronson, who is apparently a friend of Clyde. There is tension between the Pratt and Osgood families due to a bitter rivalry between Thomas Pratt and Frederick Osgood, and when tempers flare Clyde makes a bet with Pratt that the latter will not barbecue Caesar. As Pratt is already paranoid due to the hostility of local farmers opposed to his plans to cook Caesar, Wolfe offers Archie's services as a guard for Caesar in exchange for a comfortable stay at Pratt's house. During his watch that night, Lily Rowan shows up to keep Archie company, and together they discover Clyde's body, gored to death in the pasture.

The local authorities assume that Clyde was simply gored by Caesar during an attempt to sabotage Pratt's plans, but Wolfe believes that Clyde was murdered; the bull's face was cleaner than it would have been had he fatally attacked Clyde. His suspicions are shared by Frederick Osgood, who knows his son to be an experienced cattle-man who would not have made the amateurish mistakes that would have caused his death had the bull been responsible. The elder Osgood consequently hires Wolfe to learn the identity of the murderer and agrees to house him in comfort for the duration of the investigation. Archie is also hired by Caroline Pratt to prevent what she believes to be Lily Rowan's attempts to seduce her brother Jimmy.

In a meeting with Waddell, the local district attorney, Wolfe proposes that the murder weapon was in fact a digging pick that the murderer used to fake the attack, having first knocked Clyde out and dragged him into the paddock. Waddell, who has a petty rivalry with the elder Osgood, is skeptical but is nevertheless convinced to reopen the investigation. However, before the investigation can proceed far, sudden news comes that Caesar has died suddenly of anthrax. In order to prevent it spreading, this means that the bull will be automatically cremated. Wolfe dispatches Archie to either delay the cremation or take as many photos of the bull as possible before this, but Archie arrives too late to do either.

After interviewing Nancy Osgood, Wolfe learns that Bronson is in fact a New York loan shark who has been shadowing Clyde in order to ensure he receives $10,000 that Clyde borrowed to cover his gambling debts. When confronted by Wolfe and Archie, Bronson confirms this, but is vague and unhelpful when questioned regarding Clyde's death, leading Wolfe to suspect that Bronson knows more than he is saying. Out of respect for Nancy Osgood, Wolfe has Archie recover the promissory note Bronson was holding over Clyde by force, but warns the loan shark to be careful.

The next day, Wolfe's orchids win numerous prizes at the exposition, defeating a hated rival in the process. While following some of Wolfe's instructions, Archie discovers Jimmy Pratt and Nancy Osgood in a secret rendezvous; the two are lovers, but have kept their relationship secret from their feuding parents. By chance, during their confrontation Archie also stumbles upon the body of Howard Bronson, gored with a pitchfork and hidden under straw. He manages to conceal the body and returns to Wolfe with the news. But when the body is discovered, Archie is detained by Captain Barrow, the bullying local head of the state police, and is imprisoned by the authorities as a material witness when he refuses to reveal what he knows.

The next day, Wolfe secures Archie's release with the promise to that he knows who the murderer is and will soon expose him to the authorities. To Archie, Wolfe admits that despite knowing the murderer's identity, the evidence that will enable him to prove it has been efficiently destroyed. Nevertheless, based on his memory and official records from the local farming authorities, Wolfe draws some sketches of the bull that he and Archie encountered and uses them to confront Monte McMillan. Wolfe has deduced that the bull that Thomas Pratt purchased and intended to barbecue was not, in fact, Caesar at all. The champion bull was killed in an anthrax outbreak that decimated almost all of McMillan's herd, and the bull that was passed off as Caesar was in fact Hickory Buckingham Pell, a similar but inferior twin. Facing financial ruin, McMillan sold Buckingham as Caesar for an outrageous sum, but due to his experience with cattle Clyde realised the deception and was planning to expose it to win his bet. McMillan thus murdered Clyde to silence him, and later killed Bronson when the loan shark, realising that McMillan was the murderer, tried to blackmail him.

Although Wolfe admits that McMillan has covered his tracks well and is unlikely to be convicted of murder, the evidence Wolfe has manufactured is sufficient to convict McMillan of fraud, which would expose and ruin him nonetheless. Accepting defeat, McMillan reveals that he has infected himself with anthrax and agrees to write a confession out for Wolfe before dying. Months later, Archie records the case, revealing in the process that Jimmy Pratt and Nancy Osgood are engaged to be married and that he has begun a friendship with Lily Rowan, who has returned to New York.

The unfamiliar word
"Nero Wolfe talks in a way that no human being on the face of the earth has ever spoken, with the possible exception of Rex Stout after he had a gin and tonic," said Michael Jaffe, executive producer of the A&E TV series, A Nero Wolfe Mystery. Nero Wolfe's erudite vocabulary is one of the hallmarks of the character. Examples of unfamiliar words — or unfamiliar uses of words that some would otherwise consider familiar — are found throughout the corpus, often in the give-and-take between Wolfe and Archie. Stout did not normally resort to Latin phrases, but Some Buried Caesar contains several.

 Plerophory, chapter 1. Wolfe to Archie, after the shock of the collision that follows a blown tire:
It has happened, and here we are. I presume you know, since I've told you, that my distrust and hatred of vehicles in motion is partly based on my plerophory that their apparent submission to control is illusory and that they may, at their pleasure, and sooner or later will, act on whim. Very well, this one has, and we are intact. Thank God the whim was not a deadlier one.
 Ignoratio elenchi, chapter 4. Wolfe places the Latin phrase subsequent to "sophistry" and "casuistry". Unfamiliarity is a personal and subjective concept.
 Petitio principii, chapter 8, spoken by District Attorney Carter Waddell.
 Apodictically, chapter 9. Wolfe to Frederick Osgood:
Elimination, as such, is tommyrot. Innocence is a negative and can never be established; you can only establish guilt. The only way I can apodictically eliminate any individual from consideration as the possible murderer is to find out who did it. 
 Ethology, chapter 13. Wolfe, after Bronson accuses him of name calling:
Just so. I can excoriate stupidity, and often do, because it riles me, but moral indignation is a dangerous indulgence. Ethology is a chaos. Financial banditry, for example ... I either condemn it or I don't; and if I do, without prejudice, where will I find jailers? No. My only excuse for labeling you an unscrupulous blackguard is the dictionary, and I do it to clarify our positions. I'm in the detective business, and you're in the blackguard business ...

Cast of characters
Nero Wolfe – The private investigator
Archie Goodwin – Wolfe's assistant, and the narrator of all Wolfe stories
Thomas Pratt – The owner of a chain of fast-food restaurants, who plans to barbecue a champion Guernsey bull for publicity
Monte McMillan – The stockman who sold the champion bull Caesar to Pratt
Frederick Osgood – Pratt's neighbor, a wealthy landowner whose prodigal son is found gored to death in a cow pasture
Clyde and Nancy Osgood – Frederick Osgood's son and daughter
Caroline and Jimmy Pratt – Thomas Pratt's niece and nephew
Lily Rowan – A free spirit from Manhattan with whom Clyde Osgood is smitten. Introduced in this book, Miss Rowan makes frequent appearances later in the series, as a prominent figure in some plots and as Archie's close friend.
Howard Bronson – A mysterious, sinister acquaintance of Clyde Osgood, also from Manhattan

Reviews and commentary
 Isaac Anderson, The New York Times Book Review (February 5, 1939) — Only twice since Rex Stout began to record his adventures in detection has Nero Wolfe left his home for an extended stay. The first time was when he attended a convention of chefs (Too Many Cooks). This time he goes to exhibit his orchids, and again he arrives at the scene of a murder before it happens. A prize bull is suspected of the killing, but Wolfe knows better, although he keeps his opinion to himself because he prefers not to take on another investigation away from home. When it proves impossible to keep out of the case he agrees to take a hand and the mystery is as good as solved, even though it does look at times as though Wolfe has, for once, met his match. The story is told in the usual breezy Rex Stout manner — the breeziness being supplied chiefly by Archie Goodwin — and anybody who reads detective stories can tell you that Rex Stout and Nero Wolfe make a combination that is hard to beat.
 Jacques Barzun and Wendell Hertig Taylor, A Catalogue of Crime — The story of the prize bull, to be highly esteemed by all Stout partisans. Nero and Archie in top form despite rural surroundings.
 Clifton Fadiman, The New Yorker (February 3, 1939) — Clyde Osgood is found gored to death, and Hickory Caesar Grindon, prize bull, is the natural suspect. Fortunately, Nero Wolfe and his Watson, Archie Goodwin, are on the spot to run down the real murderer. Mr. Stout's dialogue and clever plots seem to get better and better.
The Saturday Review of Literature (February 4, 1939) — Ingenious plot, Nero's eccentricities, Archie Goodwin's wise-cracks keep story on Stout's best level. Verdict: Unbeatable.
Terry Teachout, About Last Night, "Forty years with Nero Wolfe" (January 12, 2009) — Rex Stout's witty, fast-moving prose hasn't dated a day, while Wolfe himself is one of the enduringly great eccentrics of popular fiction. I've spent the past four decades reading and re-reading Stout's novels for pleasure, and they have yet to lose their savor  ... It is to revel in such writing that I return time and again to Stout's books, and in particular to The League of Frightened Men, Some Buried Caesar, The Silent Speaker, Too Many Women, Murder by the Book, Before Midnight, Plot It Yourself, Too Many Clients, The Doorbell Rang, and Death of a Doxy, which are for me the best of all the full-length Wolfe novels.
Time (March 6, 1939) — Attempted barbecue of a championship bull cooks the goose of two up-State New Yorkers. Not expert-proof, but Nero Wolfe's sleuthing and Archie Goodwin's cracks make it Rex Stout's best.

Adaptations

Per la fama di Cesare (Radiotelevisione Italiana)
Some Buried Caesar was adapted for a series of Nero Wolfe films produced by the Italian television network RAI (Radiotelevisione Italiana). Directed by Giuliana Berlinguer from a teleplay by Edoardo Anton, Nero Wolfe: Per la fama di Cesare first aired March 11, 1969.

The series of black-and-white telemovies stars Tino Buazzelli (Nero Wolfe), Paolo Ferrari (Archie Goodwin), Pupo De Luca (Fritz Brenner), Renzo Palmer (Inspector Cramer), Roberto Pistone (Saul Panzer), Mario Righetti (Orrie Cather) and Gianfranco Varetto (Fred Durkin). Other members of the cast of Per la fama di Cesare include Gabriella Pallotta (Lily Rowan), Antonio Rais (Dave), Aldo Giuffrè (Thomas Pratt), Umberto Ceriani (Jimmy), Franco Sportelli (MacMillan), Giorgio Favretto (Clyde Osgood) and Nicoletta Languasco (Nancy Osgood).

Publication history

1938, The American Magazine, December 1938, abridged as "The Red Bull"
1939, New York: Farrar & Rinehart, February 2, 1939, hardcover
In his limited-edition pamphlet, Collecting Mystery Fiction #9, Rex Stout's Nero Wolfe Part I, Otto Penzler describes the first edition of Some Buried Caesar: "Green cloth, front cover and spine printed with black; rear cover blank. Issued in a full-color pictorial dust wrapper … The first edition has the publisher's monogram logo on the copyright page. The second printing, in March 1939, is identical to the first except that the logo was dropped."
In April 2006, Firsts: The Book Collector's Magazine estimated that the first edition of Some Buried Caesar had a value of between $2,500 and $5,000.
1939, Toronto: Oxford University Press, 1939, hardcover
1939, London: Collins Crime Club, July 3, 1939, hardcover
1940, New York: Grosset & Dunlap, 1940, hardcover
1941, New York: Triangle, October 1941, hardcover
1945, New York: Dell (mapback by Gerald Gregg) #70, January 1945, as The Red Bull: A Nero Wolfe Story, paperback
1958, New York: The Viking Press, All Aces: A Nero Wolfe Omnibus (with Too Many Women and Trouble in Triplicate), May 15, 1958, hardcover
1963, New York: Pyramid (Green Door) #R931, November 1963, paperback
1972, London: Tom Stacey, 1972, hardcover
1994, New York: Bantam Crimeline  June 1994, paperback, Rex Stout Library edition with introduction by Diane Mott Davidson
1998, Auburn, California: The Audio Partners Publishing Corp., Mystery Masters  August 1998, audio cassette (unabridged, read by Michael Prichard)
2008, New York: Bantam Dell Publishing Group (with The Golden Spiders)  September 30, 2008, trade paperback
2010, New York: Bantam Crimeline   September 8, 2010, e-book

References

External links

wiki collection of quotations from Some Buried Caesar

1939 American novels
Nero Wolfe novels by Rex Stout
Works originally published in The American Magazine
Farrar & Rinehart books
American novels adapted into films